Los Orientales is an underground metro station on the Line 4 of the Santiago Metro, in Santiago, Chile. The station was opened on 30 November 2005 as part of the inaugural section of the line between Tobalaba and Grecia.

Like in Plaza Egaña, there are columns between the two tracks that support a double barrel vaulted ceiling. The station has platforms  in length.

References

Santiago Metro stations
Santiago Metro Line 4